Dubienka  is a village in Chełm County, Lublin Voivodeship, in eastern Poland, close to the border with Ukraine on the Bug River. It is the seat of the gmina (administrative district) called Gmina Dubienka.

In 1792, a battle between Polish and Russian armies took place near nearby.

The town was occupied by the Germans during World War II from 1939–1944. The Jewish population consisted of around 2,500 individuals. In May 1942, the Germans reported that there were 2,907 Jews in Dubienka, some of whom had been transported there from neighboring villages. On May 22, 1942 the Germans conducted an Aktion in which they murdered a number of Jews  at the local Jewish cemetery. On June 2, 1942,  local farmers, under German orders, took Jews by horse and wagon to Hrubieszow where they were held for two days with little food and water, then put on freight trains and taken to the Sobibór extermination camp  where they were immediately murdered. Two to three hundred were left behind as laborers. Only about fifteen Dubienka Jews survived the Holocaust.  The Jewish community ceased to exist.

The village has a current population of 1,042.

References

Villages in Chełm County
Kholm Governorate
Holocaust locations in Poland